Raymond Robertsen (born 12 September 1974 in Hammerfest) is a Norwegian politician for the Conservative Party.

He was elected to the Norwegian Parliament from Finnmark in 2001, but was not re-elected in 2005.

Robertsen was a member of the executive committee of Hammerfest municipality council from 1995 to 2001. From 1995 to 2001 he was also involved in Finnmark county council.

On March 16, 2020 Robertsen was appointed as state secretary to the Minister of Regional Development and Digitalization.

References

1974 births
Living people
People from Hammerfest
Conservative Party (Norway) politicians
Members of the Storting
21st-century Norwegian politicians